Willis Mahoney (June 13, 1895 – June 2, 1968) was an American politician from the states of Oregon and Washington. He was a member of the Washington State Legislature, was mayor of Klamath Falls, Oregon, and three times was a candidate to represent Oregon in the United States Senate, losing to Charles L. McNary in 1936, Rufus Holman in 1938, and Guy Cordon in 1944. Mahoney also supported the Townsend Plan, a proposal presented by Francis Townsend for a national sales tax to pay for a $200 monthly pension for everyone over age 60. Mahoney also supported president Roosevelt's New Deal.

A native of Idaho, Mahoney had lived in Oregon for five years before announcing his campaign for U.S. Senate against McNary, but he proved to be an aggressive opponent to the senator, at times asking crowds: "Has anybody seen from our Senior Senator lately?" The election was close, but McNary was reelected.

One year after his defeat, Mahoney was charged with reckless driving in an incident that killed Thomas L. Zimmerman of Shedd. But he filed for another race for U.S. Senate in 1938, and won the Democratic primary.

The reckless driving case seemed to be over by 1938, but it was reopened during the campaign, but did not affect Mahoney's campaign from moving forward, but he lost the race 55–45% to Holman, and was defeated for yet another run for the Senate in 1944, by Guy Cordon. He died in 1968.

References

External links
 news.google.com
 Our Campaigns - OR US Senate - Special Election Race - Nov 07, 1944
 "Willis Mahoney Speaks in Bend", The Bend Bulletin, October 11, 1938

1895 births
1968 deaths
Politicians from Klamath Falls, Oregon
Mayors of places in Oregon
Place of birth missing
20th-century American politicians
Members of the Washington House of Representatives